Li Yajun may refer to:

 Li Yajun (sport shooter) (born 1973), male Chinese sports shooter
 Li Yajun (weightlifter) (born 1993), female Chinese weightlifter